Miguel Iglesias District is one of twelve districts of the province Celendín in Peru.

References